The Santa Monica Camera Obscura is a publicly accessible historical camera obscura, located in Palisades Park overlooking the Pacific Ocean, in Santa Monica, California.

Installed (and perhaps constructed) by Santa Monica mayor Robert F. Jones around 1898, the camera obscura was one of the attractions on the Balloon Route streetcar tour of Los Angeles. The camera obscura has been in the current building, designed by Weldon J. Fulton, since 1955. The adjoining space was once used as a senior center and is now a community art center.

References

External links
 Camera Obscura Art Lab at 1450 Ocean

Camera obscuras
Buildings and structures in Santa Monica, California
Tourist attractions in Santa Monica, California
1955 establishments in California